Harry Bennett (1892–1979) was an American businessman.

Harry Bennett may also refer to:

Harry Scott Bennett (1877–1959), Australian socialist speaker and organiser
Harry Bennett (cricketer) (1859–1898), Australian cricketer
Harry Bennett, coach of Liz McColgan
Harry Bennett, witness against Dixie Mafia
Harry Bennett, character in List of The Good Life episodes

See also
Henry Bennett (disambiguation)
Harold Bennett (disambiguation)